Worland is a city in Washakie County, Wyoming, United States. The population was 5,487 at the 2010 census. It is the county seat of Washakie County. It is located within the Big Horn Basin and along the Big Horn River in northwestern Wyoming.

Demographics

2010 census
As of the census of 2010, there were 5,487 people, 2,310 households, and 1,479 families living in the city. The racial makeup of the city was 89.9% White, 0.3% African American, 1.3% Native American, 0.6% Asian, 5.3% from other races, and 2.6% from two or more races. Hispanic or Latino of any race were 16.6% of the population.

There were 2,310 households, of which 29.6% had children under the age of 18 living with them, 49.7% were married couples living together, 9.9% had a female householder with no husband present, 4.5% had a male householder with no wife present, and 36.0% were non-families. 32.1% of all households were made up of individuals, and 13.6% had someone living alone who was 65 years of age or older. The average household size was 2.34 and the average family size was 2.95.

The median age in the city was 39.8 years. 25.2% of residents were under the age of 18; 7% were between the ages of 18 and 24; 23.5% were from 25 to 44; 26.5% were from 45 to 64; and 17.8% were 65 years of age or older. The gender makeup of the city was 48.5% male and 51.5% female.

2000 census
As of the census of 2000, there were 5,250 people, 2,130 households, and 1,439 families living in the city. The population density was 1,274.1 people per square mile (492.0/km2). There were 2,334 housing units at an average density of 566.4 per square mile (218.7/km2). The racial makeup of the city was 89.47% White, 0.06% African American, 0.57% Native American, 0.84% Asian, 6.72% from other races, and 2.34% from two or more races. Hispanic or Latino of any race were 13.49% of the population.

There were 2,130 households, out of which 32.4% had children under the age of 18 living with them, 55.8% were married couples living together, 9.2% had a female householder with no husband present, and 32.4% were non-families. 29.2% of all households were made up of individuals, and 13.8% had someone living alone who was 65 years of age or older. The average household size was 2.41 and the average family size was 3.00.

In the city, the population was spread out, with 26.2% under the age of 18, 7.5% from 18 to 24, 25.3% from 25 to 44, 23.8% from 45 to 64, and 17.3% who were 65 years of age or older. The median age was 39 years. For every 100 females, there were 92.7 males. For every 100 females age 18 and over, there were 91.3 males.

The median income for a household in the city was $31,447, and the median income for a family was $42,453. Males had a median income of $31,411 versus $20,777 for females. The per capita income for the city was $17,208. About 9.7% of families and 15.4% of the population were below the poverty line, including 22.4% of those under age 18 and 15.6% of those age 65 or over.

Geography and climate
Worland is located on the Big Horn River, in the Big Horn Basin.

Due to the location within the Big Horn Basin, it is protected from severe weather by the surrounding mountains from nearly every direction. This topography results in weather that is highly continental with frigid and dry winters, little wind, little rainfall and few storms. Worland is the least windy municipality located in the State of Wyoming.

Worland falls into USDA Hardiness Zone 4b.

According to the Köppen Climate Classification system, Worland has a cool semi-arid climate, abbreviated BSk on climate maps, although it borders on a cool arid climate (BWk).

Government and infrastructure

The United States Postal Service operates the Worland Post Office.

The Wyoming Department of Family Services Juvenile Services Division operates the Wyoming Boys' School, located in Mc Nutt, unincorporated Washakie County, near Worland. The facility was operated by the Wyoming Board of Charities and Reform until that agency was dissolved as a result of a state constitutional amendment passed in November 1990.

Although the Washington bill was narrowly defeated, similar legislation succeeded elsewhere, and Wyoming Territory was the first to give women the vote in 1869, quickly followed by Utah Territory (1870) and Washington Territory (1883). As with Wyoming, when these territories became states they preserved women's suffrage.

Economy
Worland is a hub for business in the Big Horn Basin. The economy of Worland is supported by agriculture and oil and gas drilling. Sugar beets are the top agricultural product of the area. Top employers in Worland include  Admiral Beverage, Wyoming Sugar Company, Crown Cork & Seal, and MillerCoors.

Education
Public education in the city of Worland is provided by Washakie County School District #1. The district operates five campuses – East Side Elementary, South Side Elementary, West Side Elementary, Worland Middle School, and Worland High School.

Worland has a public library, a branch of the Washakie County Library.

Transportation
The city of Worland is served by Worland Municipal Airport.

The city is also served by U.S. Route 20 to the south, U.S. Route 16 to the east, and the combined US highways 20/16 to the north.

Worland Senior Center also provides a demand response service on weekdays and Sundays

See also

 List of cities in Wyoming

References

External links

 

 
Cities in Washakie County, Wyoming
Cities in Wyoming
County seats in Wyoming
Populated places established in 1900
1900 establishments in Wyoming